Village councils in Antigua and Barbuda are local government bodies responsible for the administration of the villages on the Island of Antigua. Village councils are responsible for the delivery of public services, such as waste management, road maintenance, and community development projects, to the residents of the village. Village councils are also responsible for collecting taxes and fees from residents, as well as for creating and enforcing local by-laws and regulations. The members of the village councils are elected by the residents of the village, and they serve a specified term of office. The village councils work in collaboration with the national government of Antigua and Barbuda to ensure the effective delivery of services to the communities they serve.

A system of village councils was created by the Village Councils Act (1945).

Current status 
Village councils are currently inactive in Antigua and Barbuda, and the current Prime Minister Gaston Browne has expressed opposition to the reestablishment of Village councils.

References 
Local government in Antigua and Barbuda